The Polish–Lithuanian–Ruthenian Commonwealth (Republic of Three Nations) was a proposed European state in the 17th century that would have replaced the existing Polish–Lithuanian Commonwealth, but it was never actually formed.

The establishment of the Grand Duchy of Ruthenia was considered at various times, particularly during the 1648 Cossack insurrection, against Polish rule in the primarily-ethnically Ukrainian territories (see Khmelnytsky Uprising). Such a Ruthenian duchy, as proposed in the 1658 Treaty of Hadiach, would have been a full-fledged member of the Polish–Lithuanian Commonwealth, which would thereby have become a tripartite Polish–Lithuanian–Ruthenian Commonwealth. In May 1659, the Polish Diet (Sejm) ratified the treaty with an amended text. The plan, as envisioned by Yuri Nemyrych, would have ennobled a portion of the Cossacks, which would then run the Grand Principality of Rus' (1658). Hetman Ivan Vyhovsky could not get enough Cossacks agree to keeping the Uniate Church, which the Catholic church refused to liquidate, but many Cossacks were strongly against the idea.

The idea of a Ruthenian Duchy within the Commonwealth was completely abandoned. The Canadian historian Paul Robert Magosci believes that happened because of the divisions among the Cossacks and because of the Russian invasion. However, those events were much earlier than the signing of the Treaty of Hadiach. The Russian historian Tairova-Yakovleva regards the resistance of Polish society and papal pressure as the reasons for the failure in ratification.

The idea of a Polish–Lithuanian–Ruthenian Commonwealth revived during the January Uprising when a patriotic demonstration took place at Horodło in 1861. The so-called Second Union of Horodło was announced there by the szlachta of Congress Poland of the former Grand Duchy of Lithuania of Volhynia and of Podolia. The New Commonwealth, based on the Second Union of Horodło, was to be based on the three nations, and its proposed coat of arms included the Polish eagle, the Lithuanian Pahonia, and the patron saint of Ruthenia, the Archangel Michael.

See also 
Międzymorze (Intermarium)
Polish–Lithuanian–Muscovite Commonwealth
Ruthenian Voivodeship
 Lublin Triangle
 British–Polish–Ukrainian trilateral pact

References

External links
Rzeczpospolita Trojga Narodów
Commonwealth of Diverse Cultures

1658 in the Polish–Lithuanian Commonwealth
17th century in Ukraine
Ruthenians in the Polish–Lithuanian Commonwealth
Proposed countries
Intermarium